The 2021–22 Southern Jaguars basketball team represented Southern University in the 2021–22 NCAA Division I men's basketball season. The Jaguars, led by fourth-year head coach Sean Woods, played their home games at the F. G. Clark Center in Baton Rouge, Louisiana as members of the Southwestern Athletic Conference.

Previous season
The Jaguars finished the 2020–21 season 8–11 overall, 8–6 in SWAC play, to finish in 5th place. In the SWAC tournament, they were defeated by Grambling State in the quarterfinals.

Roster

Schedule and results

|-
!colspan=12 style=| Non-conference regular season

|-
!colspan=9 style=| SWAC regular season

|-
!colspan=12 style=| SWAC tournament
|-

|-

Source

References

Southern Jaguars basketball seasons
Southern Jaguars
Southern Jaguars basketball
Southern Jaguars basketball